Scopula pallidilinea is a moth of the  family Geometridae. It is found in China (Hong Kong), Sundaland and the Philippines.

References

Moths described in 1897
pallidilinea
Moths of Asia